Kamiliyeh (also Romanized as Kamīlīyeh) is a village in Katra Rural District, Nashta District, Tonekabon County, Mazandaran Province, Iran. At the 2006 census, its population was 315, in 90 families.

References 

Populated places in Tonekabon County